Adventure in Paris (French: Aventure à Paris) is a 1936 French comedy film directed by Marc Allégret and starring Jules Berry, Lucien Baroux and Danièle Parola.

The film's sets were designed by the art director Eugène Lourié. It was shot at the Billancourt Studios in Paris and on location around the city.

Synopsis
A carefree young man in Paris is enlisted by his landlord to try and teach him how to woo women.

Cast
 Jules Berry as Michel Levasseur  
 Lucien Baroux as Raymond Sauvaget  
 Danièle Parola as Lucienne Aubier  
 Arletty as Rose Blondel de Saint-Leu 
 Robert Seller as Le vicomte de Joymont  
 Germaine Aussey as Lili Schiaparelli  
 Julien Carette as Le chasseur du restaurant  
 Robert Vattier as Maître Corneille  
 Alsonia as Ida 
 May Francis as Suzanne  
 Gisèle Préville as Solange Surnisse  
 Chaz Chase as Lui-même  
 Floyd Du Pont as Lui-même  
 Ray Ventura as Lui-même 
 France Aubert as La chanteuse  
 Georges Bever as Le domestique de Raymond  
 Lucien Callamand 
 Jean Deiss 
 Doumel 
 Abel Jacquin 
 Philippe Janvier 
 Marc-Hély 
 Robert Ozanne 
 Robert Ralphy 
 Jacques Scey 
 Grégoire Aslan as Un membre de l'orchestre de Ray Ventura  
 Louis Gasté as Un membre de l'orchestre de Ray Ventura  
 Michèle Rauge

References

Bibliography 
 James Robert Parish. Film Actors Guide. Scarecrow Press, 1977.

External links 
 

1936 films
French comedy films
1936 comedy films
1930s French-language films
Films directed by Marc Allégret
Films shot at Billancourt Studios
Films shot in Paris
Films set in Paris
Pathé films
French black-and-white films
1930s French films